The natural element method (NEM) is a meshless method to solve partial differential equation, where the elements do not have a predefined shape as in the finite element method, but depend on the geometry.

A Voronoi diagram partitioning the space is used to create each of these elements.

Natural neighbor interpolation functions are then used to model the unknown function within each element.

Applications 
When the simulation is dynamic, this method prevents the elements to be ill-formed, having the possibility to easily redefine them at each time step depending on the geometry.

References 

Numerical differential equations

Numerical analysis
Computational fluid dynamics
Computational mathematics
Simulation